Excavators are a type of construction equipment.

Excavator may also refer to:

 Excavator (album), a 2015 album by stephaniesǐd
 Excavator (film), a 2017 South Korean drama film
 Excavator (microarchitecture), a computer microarchitecture developed by AMD
 Excavator (Transformers), a transformer toy

See also
 Excavate (disambiguation)
 Excavation (disambiguation)